Wackersdorf is a municipality in the district of Schwandorf in Bavaria, Germany. It is famous for playing host to rounds of the CIK-FIA Karting European Championship.

See also
Wackersdorf nuclear reprocessing plant
Anti-nuclear movement in Germany
Armin Weiss
Hildegard Breiner

References

Schwandorf (district)